Hugo-Ugo  is a Soviet/Russian post-punk band from Tolyatti that was active from 1990 to 2007.

History
The band was founded in May 1990 by artists Vladimir Krasnoshchyokov and Alexei Kondratiev. At first, the musical group did not have its own name. In July of the same year, guitarist Maksim Kotomtsev joined the band.

The name Hugo-Ugo was invented by the artist Alexei Alyapkin. According to him, it was a tribute to the American band Pere Ubu.

The first line-up
 Vladimir Krasnoshchyokov – vocals, guitar
 Alexei Kondratiev – vocals, percussion, children's harmonica
 Yuri Paliy – percussion
 Alla Sorokina – flute

Official albums

References

Musical groups established in 1990
Soviet punk rock groups
Russian post-punk music groups
Tolyatti